In mathematics, a Pfister form is a particular kind of quadratic form, introduced by Albrecht Pfister in 1965. In what follows, quadratic forms are considered over a field F of characteristic not 2.  For a natural number n, an n-fold Pfister form over F is a quadratic form of dimension 2n that can be written as a tensor product of quadratic forms

for some nonzero elements a1, ..., an of F. (Some authors omit the signs in this definition; the notation here simplifies the relation to Milnor K-theory, discussed below.)

So the 1-fold and 2-fold Pfister forms look like:

.

For n ≤ 3, the n-fold Pfister forms are norm forms of composition algebras.  In that case, two n-fold Pfister forms are isomorphic if and only if the corresponding composition algebras are isomorphic. In particular, this gives the classification of octonion algebras.

The n-fold Pfister forms additively generate the n-th power I n of the fundamental ideal of the Witt ring of F.

Characterizations
A quadratic form q over a field F is multiplicative if, for vectors of indeterminates x and y, we can write q(x).q(y) = q(z) for some vector z of rational functions in the x and y over F.  Isotropic quadratic forms are multiplicative.  For anisotropic quadratic forms, Pfister forms are multiplicative, and conversely.

For n-fold Pfister forms with n ≤ 3, this had been known since the 19th century; in that case z can be taken to be bilinear in x and y, by the properties of composition algebras. It was a remarkable discovery by Pfister that n-fold Pfister forms for all n are multiplicative in the more general sense here, involving rational functions. For example, he deduced that for any field F and any natural number n, the set of sums of 2n squares in F is closed under multiplication, using that
the quadratic form 

is an n-fold Pfister form (namely).

Another striking feature of Pfister forms is that every isotropic Pfister form is in fact hyperbolic, that is, isomorphic to a direct sum of copies of the hyperbolic plane . This property also characterizes Pfister forms, as follows: If q is an anisotropic quadratic form over a field F, and if q becomes hyperbolic over every extension field E such that q becomes isotropic over E, then q is isomorphic to aφ for some nonzero a in F and some Pfister form φ over F.

Connection with K-theory
Let kn(F) be the n-th Milnor K-group modulo 2.  There is a homomorphism from kn(F) to the quotient In/In+1 in the Witt ring of F, given by

where the image is an n-fold Pfister form.  The homomorphism is surjective, since the Pfister forms additively generate In.  One part of the Milnor conjecture, proved by Orlov, Vishik and Voevodsky, states that this homomorphism is in fact an isomorphism . That gives an explicit description of the abelian group In/In+1 by generators and relations. The other part of the Milnor conjecture, proved by Voevodsky, says that kn(F) (and hence In/In+1) maps isomorphically to the Galois cohomology group Hn(F, F2).

Pfister neighbors
A Pfister neighbor is an anisotropic form σ which is isomorphic to a subform of aφ for some nonzero a in F and some Pfister form φ with  dim φ < 2 dim σ.  The associated Pfister form φ is determined up to isomorphism by σ.  Every anisotropic form of dimension 3 is a Pfister neighbor; an anisotropic form of dimension 4 is a Pfister neighbor if and only if its discriminant in F*/(F*)2 is trivial. A field F has the property that every 5-dimensional anisotropic form over F is a Pfister neighbor if and only if it is a linked field.

Notes

References
 
 , Ch. 10
 

Quadratic forms